Herberth Quesada (born 28 September 1959) is a Costa Rican footballer. He competed in the men's tournament at the 1980 Summer Olympics.

References

1959 births
Living people
Costa Rican footballers
Costa Rica international footballers
Olympic footballers of Costa Rica
Footballers at the 1980 Summer Olympics
Place of birth missing (living people)
Association football midfielders